"Just Say I Love Her" ("Just Say I Love Him" when recorded by a female singer) is a popular song, adapted from the Neapolitan song "Dicitencello vuje". The original music was written by Neapolitan composer Rodolfo Falvo in 1930; and was arranged in United States by Jack Val and Jimmy Dale; the original Neapolitan lyrics by Enzo Fusco, and English lyrics by Martin Kalmanoff and Sam Ward.

A recording by Johnny Desmond was made on January 20, 1950, and released by MGM (catalog number 10758). It reached #24 on the Billboard chart.
Vic Damone's 1950 recording of the song reached #13 on the Billboard chart.

Recorded versions
Johnny Desmond (1950)
Frankie Avalon
Tony Bennett (1950)
Vic Damone (1950)
Eddie Fisher
Connie Francis - for her album More Italian Favorites (1960).
Timi Yuro - Hurt!!!!!!! (1961).
Sumo
Robert Goulet - My Love Forgive Me (1964).
Dean Martin - for his album Dino: Italian Love Songs (1962)
Al Martino - The Exciting Voice of Al Martino (1962).
Cliff Richard - When in Rome (1965)
Artie Shaw
Nina Simone on the 1961 album Forbidden Fruit and the 1993 album A Single Woman
Jerry Vale - I Have But One Heart (1962).
Lou Monte (1958)
Steve Lawrence - Sings of Love and Sad Young Men (1967).
Engelbert Humperdinck - We Made It Happen (1970).
Jimmy Roselli
Tito Schipa
Giuseppe di Stefano
Luciano Pavarotti
Dmitri Hvorostovsky - Passione di Napoli (2001)
Nicolae Herlea – Recital De Canțonete.
Xiu Xiu - Nina (2013).
Christian Ketter – Beloved: Live in Recital (2014).
Franco Corelli
Sergio Franchi covered this Neapolitan favorite on his 1963 Billboard Top 200 (at 66th place) album Our Man from Italy; also on his 1965 album Live From The Cocoanut Grove; and on his 1976 album 20 Magnificent Songs.  He recorded it in Italian, and in Italian/English combination.

References

1950 singles
Vic Damone songs
Johnny Desmond songs
Year of song unknown